Ethmia nigritaenia is a moth in the family Depressariidae. It is found from southern Mexico, Guatemala and Honduras to north-western Costa Rica.

The ground color of the forewings is whitish gray, clouded with pale brownish gray except at the terminal margin. The ground color of the hindwings is semitranslucent white, becoming pale brownish at the distal margins.

The larvae feed on Cordia gerascanthus.

References

Moths described in 1973
nigritaenia